The following is a list of notable deaths in January 2016.

Entries for each day are listed alphabetically by surname. A typical entry lists information in the following sequence:
Name, age, country of citizenship and reason for notability, established cause of death, reference.

January 2016

1
Natasha Aguilar, 45, Costa Rican swimmer, silver and bronze medalist at the 1987 Pan American Games, complications from a stroke.
George Alexandru, 58, Romanian theater and film actor, complications from an abdominal infection.
Fazu Aliyeva, 83, Russian Avar poet and journalist, heart failure.
Lennie Bluett, 96, American actor (Gone with the Wind, Mighty Joe Young, A Star is Born).
Dale Bumpers, 90, American politician, Governor of Arkansas (1971–1975), Senator from Arkansas (1975–1999).
Antonio Carrizo, 89, Argentine broadcaster.
Delia Córdova, 62, Peruvian Olympic volleyball player.
Jacques Deny, 99, French mathematician.
Brian Johns, 79, Australian company director, managing director of the Australian Broadcasting Corporation (1995–2000), cancer.
Gilbert Kaplan, 74, American conductor and businessman, cancer.
Helmut Koester, 89, German-born American history professor.
Tony Lane, 71, American art director (Rolling Stone), brain cancer.
Mark B, 45, British hip-hop record producer.
Gilberto Mendes, 93, Brazilian composer.
John Coleman Moore, 92, American mathematician.
Homa Nategh, 80, Iranian educator and historian.
Ian Pieris, 82, Sri Lankan cricketer (Cambridge University Cricket Club).
Jim Ross, 89, Scottish-born Canadian ice hockey player (New York Rangers).
Anil Salgaocar, 75, Indian executive and politician.
Fred Wiedersporn, 84, German Olympic gymnast.
Vilmos Zsigmond, 85, Hungarian-American cinematographer (Close Encounters of the Third Kind, The Deer Hunter, The Black Dahlia), Oscar winner (1978).

2
Faris al-Zahrani, 38, Saudi al-Qaeda member, execution by beheading.
Mieke Andela-Baur, 92, Dutch politician, member of the House of Representatives.
Marcel Barbeau, 90, Canadian painter and sculptor.
Ardhendu Bhushan Bardhan, 91, Indian politician, General Secretary of the Communist Party of India (1996–2012), complications from a stroke.
Vicente Camacho, 86, Northern Mariana Islands businessman and politician, member of the Marianas Political Status Commission.
Michel Delpech, 69, French singer-songwriter and actor, throat cancer.
Leonard Evans, 86, Canadian politician, complications from a heart attack.
Tim Francis, 87, New Zealand diplomat, Ambassador to the United States (1988–1991), Administrator of Tokelau (1984–1988), cancer.
Brad Fuller, 62, American video game composer (Marble Madness, Tetris, Blasteroids), Director of Engineering for Atari (1993–1996), pancreatic cancer. 
Maria Garbowska-Kierczyńska, 93, Polish actress.
Matt Hobden, 22, English cricketer (Sussex), fall.
Shigeji Kaneko, 84, Japanese boxer, OPBF featherweight champion (1953 - 1958), pneumonia.
Matthiew Klinck, 37, Canadian film director and producer (Hank and Mike), stabbed.
Thomas Johnstone McWiggan, 97, British aviation engineer.
Gisela Mota Ocampo, 33, Mexican politician, Mayor of Temixco (2016), member of the Chamber of Deputies (2012–2015), shot.
Nimr al-Nimr, 56, Saudi Shia religious leader, execution by beheading.
John Reid, 87, Australian Anglican prelate, Bishop of South Sydney (1972–1993).
Rino Salviati, 93, Italian singer, guitarist and actor.
Stanley Siegel, 79, American talk show host, pneumonia.
Fateh Singh, 51, Indian sports shooter and army officer, shot.
Mirko Vujačić, 91, Montenegrin Olympic athlete.
Frances Cress Welsing, 80, American psychiatrist and author, complications from a stroke.
Leonard White, 99, British television producer (The Avengers, Armchair Theatre) and actor.
Sabri Yirmibeşoğlu, 87, Turkish military officer, Secretary-General of the National Security Council (1988–1990), kidney failure.

3
Klaas Bakker, 89, Dutch footballer (Ajax).
Robert H. B. Baldwin, 95, American businessman (Morgan Stanley), pneumonia.
Leonard Berkowitz, 89, American social psychologist. 
Paul Bley, 83, Canadian jazz pianist.
Gary Flakne, 81, American politician, member of the Minnesota House of Representatives (1963–1973).
Amby Fogarty, 82, Irish footballer (Sunderland, Hartlepool, Cork Celtic) and manager (Cork Hibernians, Galway Rovers).
C. B. Forgotston, 70, American lawyer and political blogger, suicide by gunshot.
Cristina Grado, 76, Italian actress and voice actress.
Demmus Hentze, 92, Faroese politician, Finance Minister (1975–1981).
John McDade Howell, 93, American academic and university chancellor (East Carolina University).
Shankar Prasad Jaiswal, 83, Indian politician.
Alberto Iniesta Jiménez, 92, Spanish Roman Catholic prelate, Auxiliary Bishop of Madrid (1972–1998).
Raymond W. Lessard, 85, American Roman Catholic prelate, Bishop of Savannah (1973–1995).
Gomer Lloyd, 68, British Olympic bobsledder.
Raghu Nandan Mandal, 63, Indian politician.
Andy Maurer, 67, American football player (Atlanta Falcons, Minnesota Vikings, Denver Broncos), cancer.
Peter Naur, 87, Danish computer science pioneer, Turing Award winner.
Georg Nees, 89, German academic and artist.
Bill Plager, 70, Canadian ice hockey player (St. Louis Blues).
Peter Powell, 83, English kite maker, stroke.
Tommy Sale, 97, English rugby league player (Leigh, Widnes).
Igor Sergun, 58, Russian military officer, Director of the GRU (since 2011).
Ted Stanley, 84, American philanthropist and businessman (Danbury Mint).

4
Tom Allin, 28, English cricketer (Warwickshire), suicide by jumping.
Frank Armitage, 91, Australian-born American painter and animator (Mary Poppins, Lady and the Tramp, The Jungle Book).
Jan Aronsson, 84, Swedish footballer (Degerfors IF).
Robert Balser, 88, American animator (Yellow Submarine, Heavy Metal, The Jackson 5ive), respiratory failure.
Fernando Barrachina, 68, Spanish footballer (Valencia CF).
Stephen W. Bosworth, 76, American diplomat, Ambassador to South Korea (1997–2001), prostate cancer.
Colin Butler, 102, British entomologist.
Rūsiņš Mārtiņš Freivalds, 73, Latvian computer scientist and mathematician, heart attack.
Michel Galabru, 93, French actor (The Judge and the Assassin, La Cage aux Folles, Belle Époque).
Long John Hunter, 84, American blues guitarist and singer-songwriter.
S. H. Kapadia, 68, Indian judge, Chief Justice (2010–2012).
Jorge Lepra, 73, Uruguayan diplomat and politician, heart failure.
Maja Maranow, 54, German actress (Beloved Sisters), breast cancer.
Achim Mentzel, 69, German musician and television presenter.
Red Parker, 84, American football coach (The Citadel, Clemson, Ole Miss).
Donald J. Parsons, 93, American Episcopal prelate, Bishop of Quincy (1973–1988).
Marjorie Pizer, 95, Australian poet.
Joseph Ritz, 86, American author and playwright.
John Roberts, 69, Welsh footballer (Arsenal, Birmingham, Wrexham).
Andres Rodriguez, 31, Venezuelan equestrian competitor, silver medalist at the 2015 Pan American Games, traffic collision.
Leo Rucka, 84, American football player (San Francisco 49ers).
Gavriel Salomon, 77, Israeli educational psychologist.
Alexander O. Shirley, 88, British Virgin Islands civil servant and cricketer, Accountant General (1967–1987), namesake of the A. O. Shirley Recreation Ground. 
Antonio Soto Díaz, 66, Puerto Rican politician, member of the Puerto Rico Senate (2009–2011), heart attack.
Robert Stigwood, 81, Australian band manager (Bee Gees) and film producer (Grease, Saturday Night Fever).
Edhi Sunarso, 83, Indonesian sculptor (Selamat Datang Monument), heart failure.
André Turcat, 94, French aviator.

5
Mamdouh Abdel-Alim, 59, Egyptian actor, heart attack.
Bob Armstrong, 82, American basketball player (Philadelphia Warriors).
María Lorenza Barreneche, 89, Argentine socialite, First Lady (1983–1989).
Pierre Boulez, 90, French composer and conductor.
Agapito Robleda Castro, 83, Honduran politician.
Patrick Crofton, 80, Canadian politician.
Christine Lawrence Finney, 47, American painter and animator (Aladdin, The Lion King, Lilo & Stitch).
John Freebairn, 85, Australian politician, member of the South Australian House of Assembly for Light (1962–1970).
Percy Freeman, 70, English footballer (Lincoln City, West Bromwich Albion, Reading).
Albert Gubay, 87, British businessman (Kwik Save).
Rudolf Haag, 93, German theoretical physicist.
Lev Nikolayevich Korolyov, 89, Russian computer scientist.
Jean-Paul L'Allier, 77, Canadian politician, member of the National Assembly of Quebec (1970–1976), Mayor of Quebec City (1989–2005).
George MacIntyre, 76, American football player and coach (Vanderbilt).
Tancrède Melet, 32, French tightrope walker and base jumper, fall. 
Gerry O'Malley, 87, Irish Gaelic footballer (Roscommon).
Uche Okeke, 82, Nigerian artist.
Antônio Pompêo, 62, Brazilian actor.
Michael Purcell, 70, Australian rugby union player.
Jay Ritchie, 79, American baseball player (Boston Red Sox, Atlanta Braves, Cincinnati Reds).
Anatoly Roshchin, 83, Russian heavyweight wrestler, Olympic champion (1972).
Elizabeth Swados, 64, American composer and writer (Runaways), complications from surgery.
Keith Thiele, 94, New Zealand WW2 pilot.
Alex Timpson, 69, British children's rights activist.
Hanna-Marie Weydahl, 93, Norwegian pianist.

6
Robert D. Acland, 74, American surgeon (Acland's Video Atlas of Human Anatomy).
Maliheh Afnan, 81, Palestinian-born artist.
Alfredo "Chocolate" Armenteros, 87, Cuban trumpeter, prostate cancer.
Ladislav Bačík, 82, Czech Olympic swimmer.
Douglas Greer, 94, American actor (Our Gang).
Pat Harrington Jr., 86, American actor (One Day at a Time, Captain Caveman and the Teen Angels, The Inspector), complications from a brain haemorrhage.
Florence King, 80, American writer.
Serena Sinclair Lesley, 89, American journalist.
Christy O'Connor Jnr, 67, Irish golfer.
Silvana Pampanini, 90, Italian actress (The Road a Year Long, The City Stands Trial, A Husband for Anna).
Ioannis Petridis, 84, Greek politician, MP for Pieria (1985–1989).
Sol Polansky, 89, American diplomat, Ambassador to Bulgaria (1987–1990).
Qian Min, 100, Chinese politician.
Marion Studholme, 88, English soprano and music teacher. 
Nivaria Tejera, 86, Cuban poet and novelist, pancreatic cancer.
Labhshankar Thakar, 80, Indian author.
Robert D. Timm, 94, American politician.
Yves Vincent, 94, French actor.
Zbigniew Zychowicz, 62, Polish politician, Marshal of West Pomeranian Voivodeship (1999–2000).

7
Oscar Ray Bolin, 53, American serial killer, execution by lethal injection.
Brahim Chergui, 94, Algerian militant.
Patrick Connolly, 88–89, Irish lawyer, Attorney General (1982).
André Courrèges, 92, French fashion designer.
Robert M. Cundick, 89, American organist and composer. 
Paddy Doherty, 89, Northern Irish civil rights activist.
Michael J. Egan, 89, American politician.
Bill Foster, 86, American college basketball coach (Rutgers, Utah, Duke, South Carolina).
Joaquín Gamboa Pascoe, 93, Mexican trade union leader and politician.
Robert Goossens, 88, French jeweller.
Alwin Albert Hafner, 85, Malagasy Roman Catholic prelate, Bishop of Morombe (1989–2000).
Alan Haven, 80, English jazz organist.
John Johnson, 68, American basketball player (Cleveland Cavaliers, Houston Rockets, Seattle SuperSonics), NBA Champion (1979).
Kitty Kallen, 94, American singer ("Little Things Mean a Lot").
Judith Kaye, 77, American lawyer, Chief Judge of the New York Court of Appeals (1993–2008), cancer.
István Komáromi, 72, Hungarian politician, MP (1994–1998).
Richard Libertini, 82, American actor (Fletch, All of Me, Popeye), cancer.
Cristian Moisescu, 68, Romanian politician, Mayor of Arad (1992–1996).
William H. O'Dell, 77, American politician, member of the South Carolina Senate (since 1989).
Houshang Ostovar, 88, Iranian composer.
Jit Samaroo, 65, Trinidadian Steelpan musician and arranger.
Ashraf Pahlavi, 96, Persian princess, President of the Women's Organization of Iran (1967–1979).
Mufti Mohammad Sayeed, 79, Indian politician, Chief Minister of Jammu and Kashmir (2002–2005, since 2015), Minister of Home Affairs (1989–1990), multiple organ failure.
Troy Shondell, 76, American singer, complications from Alzheimer's disease and Parkinson's disease.
Sergey Shustikov, 45, Russian football player (Torpedo Moscow) and manager (Solyaris Moscow).
Sergei Simonov, 23, Russian ice hockey player (HC Lipetsk), complications after spleen surgery.
Anton Srholec, 86, Slovak writer and priest, lung cancer.
Anna Synodinou, 88, Greek politician and actress (The 300 Spartans).
János György Szilágyi, 97, Hungarian historian.
Yeow Chai Thiam, 62, Malaysian politician, cancer. 
Jesús María Ramón Valdés, 77, Mexican politician.
Sir Christopher Wallace, 73, British army lieutenant general, Commandant Royal College of Defence Studies (2001–2005), amyloidosis.
Hansrudi Wäscher, 87, German comics artist.
Valerio Zanone, 79, Italian politician, Secretary of Italian Liberal Party (1976–1985) and Mayor of Turin (1990–1991).

8
Hamdy Ahmed, 82, Egyptian actor (Al-Kahira 30, Al-Ard, Al Asfour).
Horst Boog, 88, German historian.
Otis Clay, 73, American R&B and soul singer ("Tryin' to Live My Life Without You", "The Only Way Is Up"), heart attack.
Maria Teresa de Filippis, 89, Italian racing driver, first woman to race in Formula One (Maserati, Behra-Porsche).
Oscar Fritschi, 76, Swiss politician.
Ida Gaskin, 96, Welsh-born New Zealand teacher and quiz show contestant.
Alessandro Ghinami, 92, Italian politician, President of Sardinia (1979–1980).
M. O. Joseph, 86, Indian film producer.
Medea Jugeli, 90, Georgian gymnast, Olympic champion (1952).
Gunaram Khanikar, 66, Indian herbalist.
Diana Mitchell, 83, Zimbabwean political activist and writer.
German Moreno, 82, Philippine television host (That's Entertainment, Walang Tulugan with the Master Showman, GMA Supershow) and actor, cardiac arrest.
Royal Parker, 86, American television personality, heart failure.
Paddy Reid, 91, Irish rugby union and league player.
Red Simpson, 81, American country singer-songwriter ("I'm a Truck"), complications from a heart attack.
Brett Smiley, 60, American singer-songwriter.
Piet Steenkamp, 90, Dutch politician, President of the Senate (1983–1991).
Risto Syrjänen, 90, Finnish Olympic hurdler.
Carlos Milcíades Villalba Aquino, 91, Paraguayan Roman Catholic prelate, Bishop of San Juan Bautista de las Misiones (1978–1999).

9
Barbara Allyne Bennet, 76, American actress (Mac and Me, The Office).
Myra Carter, 86, American actress (Three Tall Women, 8mm), pneumonia.
Merab Chigoev, 65, South Ossetian politician, Prime Minister (1998–2001), traffic collision.
Lawrence H. Cohn, 78, American surgeon, stroke.
Cielito del Mundo, 80, Filipino singer, actress and politician, heart attack.
Henri Delerue, 76, French Olympic racewalker.
Hamada Emam, 68, Egyptian footballer (Zamalek SC).
Peter Gavin Hall, 64, Australian statistician, leukemia.
John Harvard, 77, Canadian politician, Lieutenant Governor of Manitoba (2004–2009).
Gareth Hoskins, 48, Scottish architect, complications from a heart attack.
Johnny Jordan, 94, English footballer (Tonbridge).
Mike McGinnity, 74, English football chairman (Coventry City).
Robert Naegele, 90, German actor (The NeverEnding Story II, The Old Fox, Waller's Last Trip).
 Umberto Raho, 93, Italian actor (The Bird with the Crystal Plumage, The Last Man on Earth, Superfantagenio).
Lance Rautzhan, 63, American baseball player (Los Angeles Dodgers, Milwaukee Brewers), cancer.
José María Rivas, 57, Salvadoran footballer (national team), leukemia.
Gianni Rondolino, 83, Italian film critic and historian, founder of the Turin Film Festival.
Paul-Marie François Rousset, 94, French Roman Catholic prelate, Bishop of Saint-Étienne (1971–1987).
Angus Scrimm, 89, American actor (Phantasm, Alias, John Dies at the End), prostate cancer.
Beau St. Clair, 63, American film producer (The Thomas Crown Affair, The November Man, Laws of Attraction), ovarian cancer.
St Jovite, 26, American-bred Irish-trained racehorse, winner of the 1992 Irish Derby and King George VI and Queen Elizabeth Stakes.
Ed Stewart, 74, British TV and radio broadcaster (Top of the Pops, Crackerjack), stroke.
Vicente Troudart, 64, Panamanian baseball umpire.
Peggy Willis-Aarnio, 67, American ballet choreographer.
Zelimkhan Yaqub, 65, Azerbaijani poet.

10
Abbas Bahri, 61, Tunisian mathematician and professor (Rutgers University).
Wim Bleijenberg, 85, Dutch footballer (Ajax, national team).
David Bowie, 69, English singer-songwriter, musician ("Heroes", "Space Oddity") and actor (Labyrinth), six-time Grammy winner, liver cancer.
Bård Breivik, 67, Norwegian sculptor, cancer.
Alton Brown, 90, American baseball player (Washington Senators).
Ann Z. Caracristi, 94, American cryptographer, Deputy Director of the NSA (1980–1982), complications from dementia.
Charles Congden Carpenter, 94, American naturalist.
Teofil Codreanu, 74, Romanian footballer (Rapid București).
Jeanne Córdova, 67, German-born American LGBT activist, brain cancer.
Carolyn Denning, 88, American pediatrician, stroke.
Michael Galeota, 31, American actor (The Jersey, Bailey Kipper's P.O.V.), heart disease and hypertension.
Hernán Gamboa, 69, Venezuelan musician (Serenata Guayanesa), cancer.
Ulrich Hahnen, 63, German politician, Deputy of the Landtag of North Rhine-Westphalia (since 2010), cancer.
Ralph Hauenstein, 103, American philanthropist and businessman.
Alex Hickman, 90, Canadian judge and politician.
Francis Thomas Hurley, 88, American Roman Catholic prelate, Archbishop of Anchorage (1976–2001), Bishop of Juneau (1971–1976).
George Jonas, 80, Hungarian-born Canadian writer (Vengeance), Parkinson's disease.
Kalevi Lehtovirta, 87, Finnish Olympic footballer (1952).
Anthony Mellows, 79, British barrister and academic, Lord Prior of the Order of St John (2008–2014).
Connie Mhone, 47, Malawian netball player and coach.
Bob Oatley, 87, Australian yachtsman (Wild Oats XI) and winemaker (Rosemount).
Arthur S. Obermayer, 84, American entrepreneur and philanthropist, cancer.
Dick Spady, 92, American businessman (Dick's Drive-In).
John Stokes, 70, British Army soldier and mountaineer.
The Wolfman, 80, Hungarian-born Canadian professional wrestler (WWWF).
Cornelis Zitman, 89, Dutch-born Venezuelan sculptor.
Yusuf Zuayyin, 84, Syrian politician, Prime Minister (1965, 1966–1968).

11
Budi Anduk, 47, Indonesian actor (Opera Van Java) and comedian, pneumonia.
Reginaldo Araújo, 38, Brazilian footballer, heart attack.
Elizabeth Aston, 67, English author, pancreatic cancer.
Sylvan Barnet, 89, American literary critic, cancer.
Robert Coates, 87, Canadian politician, MP (1957–1988).
Sir Kenneth Corfield, 91, British camera engineer, inventor of the Corfield Periflex.
John Easter, 70, English squash player and cricketer, World Championship silver medallist (1973). 
Berge Furre, 78, Norwegian politician and historian.
Monte Irvin, 96, American Hall of Fame baseball player (Newark Eagles, New York Giants, Chicago Cubs), winner of the 1954 World Series.
Yevgeny Kotlov, 66, Russian Soviet ice hockey player (Dynamo Moscow).
Albert Onyembo Lomandjo, 84, Congolese Roman Catholic prelate, Bishop of Kindu (1966–1978).
Stanley Mann, 87, Canadian screenwriter (The Collector, Conan the Destroyer, Firestarter).
John B. Mansbridge, 98, American art director (Bedknobs and Broomsticks, Tron, The Apple Dumpling Gang).
David Margulies, 78, American actor (Ghostbusters, The Sopranos, Conversations with My Father).
Chuck Pitcock, 57, American football player (Tampa Bay Bandits).
János Radványi, 93, Hungarian-born American political scientist and diplomat, Ambassador to the United States (1962–1967).
Don Strauch, 89, American politician, Mayor of Mesa, Arizona (1980–1984), member of the Arizona House of Representatives (1987–1988), complications from a fall.
Gunnel Vallquist, 97, Swedish writer and translator (In Search of Lost Time).

12
Gian Bazzi, 84, Swiss Olympic ice hockey player (1952).
Robert Black, 68, Scottish serial killer and kidnapper, heart attack.
James L. Browning, Jr., 83, American prosecutor, fall.
Ivan Bukavshin, 20, Russian chess Grandmaster, stroke.
Rose Chibambo, 86, Malawian politician, Deputy Minister for Hospitals, Prisons and Social Welfare (1963–1964), heart attack.
Marian Czapla, 69, Polish painter.
Gastón Guzmán, 83, Mexican mycologist and anthropologist, heart attack.
Brian Johnson, 59, Australian rugby league player and coach (St. George, Warrington), Alzheimer's disease. 
Ruth Leuwerik, 91, German film actress (The Trapp Family).
Witold Mańczak, 91, Polish linguist.
Tommy Mulgrew, 86, British footballer (Southampton).
Meg Mundy, 101, American actress (Fatal Attraction, All My Children, Ordinary People).
William Needles, 97, American-Canadian actor.
Erik Olsson, 85, Swedish Olympic wrestler.
Milorad Rajović, 61, Serbian footballer.
Dave Sime, 79, American sprinter and ophthalmologist, Olympic silver medalist (1960), cancer.
Andrew Smith, 25, American basketball player (Butler Bulldogs, Neptūnas), non-Hodgkin lymphoma.
John Stevens, 86, British journalist.
Melania Ursu, 75, Romanian stage and film actress (Flames over Treasures).
Carolyn D. Wright, 67, American poet, thrombosis.

13
Luis Arroyo, 88, Puerto Rican baseball player (St. Louis Cardinals, Pittsburgh Pirates, New York Yankees), winner of the 1961 World Series, cancer.
Brian Bedford, 80, British actor (Robin Hood, Nixon, Much Ado About Nothing), cancer.
William Craig, 97, American philosopher.
Giorgio Gomelsky, 81, Georgian-born Swiss filmmaker (La Collectionneuse), impresario, band manager (The Rolling Stones, The Yardbirds), songwriter and record producer.
Bern Herbolsheimer, 67, American composer, cancer.
J. F. R. Jacob, 92, Indian military officer, pneumonia.
Sir Albert McQuarrie, 98, Scottish politician, MP for East Aberdeenshire (1979–1983) and Banff and Buchan (1983–1987).
Dick Megugorac, 87, American land speed racer and customizer.
Conrad Phillips, 90, British television and film actor (The Adventures of William Tell).
Lawrence Phillips, 40, American football player (University of Nebraska, St. Louis Rams) and convicted felon, suicide.
Vladimir Pribylovsky, 59, Russian human rights activist and journalist.
Addepalli Ramamohana Rao, 80, Indian Telugu poet.
Mike Salmon, 82, British racing driver.
Jim Simpson, 88, American sportscaster (NBC Sports).
Zaharije Trnavčević, 90, Serbian politician, Acting President of the National Assembly (2012).
G. A. Vadivelu, 90, Indian independence activist and politician.
Lois Weisberg, 90, American civil servant and socialite.
Tera Wray, 33, American pornographic actress, suicide.

14
René Angélil, 73, Canadian entertainment manager (Celine Dion), throat cancer.
George Carroll, 94, American lawyer and politician, Mayor of Richmond, California (1964–1965).
Franco Citti, 80, Italian actor (The Godfather, Accattone, The Decameron).
Calvin Greenaway, 67, Antigua and Barbuda Olympic athlete.
Laurence Guest, 80, British Olympic rower.
Jim Hannah, 71, American attorney, Chief Justice of the Arkansas Supreme Court (2005–2015).
Al Hart, 88, American radio host (KCBS, KNBR, WOBT).
Glyn W. Humphreys, 61, British neuropsychologist. 
Anna Lærkesen, 73, Danish ballerina.
Franco Oppo, 80, Italian composer. 
P. M. K. Raghunath, 65, Indian cricketer.
Alan Rickman, 69, English actor (Harry Potter, Die Hard, Love Actually), BAFTA winner (1992), pancreatic cancer.
Shaolin, 44, Brazilian humorist, heart attack.
Robert Banks Stewart, 84, Scottish television writer (Doctor Who, Bergerac, Shoestring), cancer.
Shigeaki Uchino, 84, Japanese Olympic pentathlete.
Sergio Vacchi, 90, Italian painter. 
Rajesh Vivek, 66, Indian actor (Lagaan), heart attack.
Ellen Meiksins Wood, 73, American historian, cancer.
Leonid Zhabotinsky, 77, Ukrainian Soviet weightlifter, Olympic champion (1964, 1968).

15
Tunku Alif Hussein Saifuddin Al-Amin, 31, Malaysian royal.
Francisco X. Alarcón, 61, American poet, cancer.
Peter Atteslander, 89, Swiss sociologist.
James Birren, 97, American gerontologist.
Daniel Bohan, 74, Canadian Roman Catholic prelate, Archbishop of Regina (since 2005), cancer.
Robert Darène, 102, French actor (The Cage).
Robin Fletcher, 93, British academic administrator and field hockey player, Olympic bronze medallist (1952).
Anil Ganguly, 82, Indian film director (Kora Kagaz, Tapasya).
Marie L. Garibaldi, 81, American judge, first woman to serve on the New Jersey Supreme Court.  
Dan Haggerty, 74, American actor (The Life and Times of Grizzly Adams), spinal cancer.
Pete Huttlinger, 54, American guitarist (John Denver, LeAnn Rimes), stroke.
Avrom Isaacs, 89, Canadian art dealer.
Ken Judge, 58, Australian football player (East Fremantle, Hawthorn, Brisbane Bears) and coach (Hawthorn, West Coast Eagles), cancer.
Andrzej Kotkowski, 75, Polish film director (Olympics 40).
Peter Kraus, 83, German Olympic athlete.
Marvin Lipofsky, 77, American glass artist, complications of diabetes.
P. J. Mara, 73, Irish public affairs consultant, Senator (1977–1981, 1982–1983).
Rex Morgan, 67, American basketball player (Boston Celtics), throat cancer. 
John J. Pruis, 92, American educator, President of Ball State University (1968–1978).
Alexandre Reza, 93, Russian-born French jeweler. 
Oleksandr Shevchenko, 78, Ukrainian scientist, jurist and politician, member of the Verkhovna Rada (2012–2014).
Grzegorz Strouhal, 73, Polish Olympic sport shooter.
Manuel Velázquez, 72, Spanish footballer (Real Madrid, Rayo Vallecano, Málaga), winner of the 1965–66 European Cup.
Aristide von Bienefeldt, 56, Dutch writer. 
Buzzy Wilkinson, 83, American basketball player (Virginia Cavaliers).

16
Joannis Avramidis, 93, Georgian-born Austrian sculptor.
Joan Balzar, 87, Canadian artist.
Charles L. Bestor, 91, American composer and academic.
Theodor Danetti, 89, Romanian stage and film actor.
Ananda Chandra Dutta, 92, Indian botanist.
Thor Furulund, 72, Norwegian painter.
Hubert Giraud, 94, French songwriter.
Bob Harkey, 85, American racecar driver (USAC).
Joe Hergert, 79, American football player (Buffalo Bills).
Georgie Lamon, 81, Swiss politician, shot. 
Gary Loizzo, 70, American singer (The American Breed), pancreatic cancer.
Ted Marchibroda, 84, American football player (Pittsburgh Steelers, Chicago Cardinals) and coach (Baltimore Colts, Baltimore Ravens).
Rudy Migay, 87, Canadian ice hockey player (Toronto Maple Leafs).
John Mills, 85, Canadian writer.
Carmelau Monestime, 86, Haitian-born American activist and radio broadcaster, pioneer of Haitian Creole radio in South Florida.
Hans-Joachim Reich, 85, German Olympic swimmer.
Jean-Noël Rey, 66, Swiss businessman, CEO of Swiss Post, shot.
Lloyd Rudolph, 88, American political scientist.
Mervyn Sandri, 83, New Zealand cricketer.
Leonidas B. Young, II, 62, American politician, Mayor of Richmond, Virginia (1994–1996).

17
Reza Ahadi, 53, Iranian football player and coach.
Peggy Anderson, 77, American author and journalist (The Philadelphia Inquirer).
Blowfly, 76, American musician and producer, liver cancer.
Mondli Cele, 26, South African footballer, traffic collision.
Olamide David, 14, Nigerian actor, abdominal injury.
Melvin Day, 92, New Zealand artist.
Jo de Winter, 94, American actress (Gloria, Dirty Harry, Bird).
Geethapriya, 83, Indian director (Mannina Maga).
Mic Gillette, 64, American brass player (Tower of Power), heart attack.
Dale Griffin, 67, British drummer (Mott the Hoople), Alzheimer's disease.
Gulch, 31, American thoroughbred racehorse, euthanised due to complications from cancer.
Gottfried Honegger, 98, Swiss artist and graphic designer.
Carina Jaarnek, 53, Swedish singer and Dansband artist, cerebral haemorrhage.
Stephen Levine, 78, American poet.
Jules Le Lievre, 82, New Zealand rugby union player (Canterbury, national team).
Sherron Mills, 44, American basketball player (BCM Gravelines), amyotrophic lateral sclerosis.
Ion Panțuru, 81, Romanian bobsledder, Olympic bronze medalist (1968).
Delphine Parrott, 87, British immunologist. 
Billy Quinn, 80, Irish hurler.
V. Rama Rao, 80, Indian politician, Governor of Sikkim (2002–2007).
Josef Rösch, 90, Czech-born American radiologist.
Angus Ross, 59, Scottish darts player, pancreatic cancer.
Ramblin' Lou Schriver, 86, American country musician and radio broadcaster (WXRL), heart disease.
Francis B. Schulte, 89, American Roman Catholic prelate, Archbishop of New Orleans (1988–2001).
Mike Sharpe, 64, Canadian professional wrestler (WWF).
John Taihuttu, 61, Dutch footballer (VVV, Fortuna Sittard).
Sudhindra Thirtha, 89, Indian Hindu religious leader.
Jenő Váncsa, 87, Hungarian politician, Minister of Agriculture and Food (1980–1989).

18
Leila Alaoui, 33, French-born Moroccan artist and photographer, heart attack.
António de Almeida Santos, 89, Portuguese lawyer and politician, President of Assembly of the Republic (1995–2002).
Johnny Bach, 91, American basketball player (Boston Celtics) and coach (Fordham University, Penn State, Chicago Bulls).
Terence Cook, 88, Welsh rugby union and rugby league footballer.
Manpreet Akhtar, 51, Indian Punjabi and folk singer.
Pierre DesRuisseaux, 70, Canadian poet.
Glenn Frey, 67, American songwriter, musician (Eagles) and actor (Jerry Maguire), complications following intestinal surgery.
Karsten Isachsen, 71, Norwegian priest, author and public speaker.
Andy Dog Johnson, 57, British artist, designer of many The The record sleeves, brain tumour.
Lars Roar Langslet, 79, Norwegian politician, Minister of Culture and Science (1982–1986).
Oleksiy Logvynenko, 69, Ukrainian translator (The Catcher in the Rye).
Loredana, 91, Italian actress (Immigrants, The King's Jester, La Fornarina).
Mike MacDowel, 83, British racing driver (Cooper), cancer.
Pablo Manavello, 65, Italian-born Venezuelan musician.
William Morgan, 85, American architect.
Else Marie Pade, 91, Danish composer.
Asha Patil, 79, Indian actress.
Thrisadee Sahawong, 35, Thai actor.
T. S. Sinnathuray, 85, Singaporean Supreme Court judge, pneumonia.
Antonella Steni, 89, Italian actress (The Tiger and the Pussycat, Kaputt Mundi, Nel sole).
Joe Sweeney, 82, Australian Olympic wrestler.
Michel Tournier, 91, French writer (Friday, or, The Other Island, The Erl-King).
Nicolaus Zwetnow, 86, Norwegian sport shooter.

19
William G. Bowdler, 91, American diplomat, Ambassador to South Africa (1975–1978).
Robert M. Carter, 73, British-born Australian marine geologist and climate change denier, complications from a heart attack.
Antonia Churchill, 96, American Olympic sailor (1936). 
John Corcoran, 56, Irish sports administrator.
Jean-Philippe Douin, 75, French military officer, Chief of the Defence Staff (1995–1998).
Joachim Fernandez, 43, Senegalese footballer. 
M. K. A. D. S. Gunawardana, 68, Sri Lankan politician, Minister of Lands (since 2015).
Claude Lefebvre, 86, Canadian politician, Mayor of Laval, Quebec (1981–1989).
Laurence Lerner, 90, South African-born British literary critic.
Richard Levins, 85, American mathematical ecologist and population geneticist.
Forrest McDonald, 89, American historian and constitutional scholar.
Sylvia McLaughlin, 99, American environmentalist, co-founder of Save the Bay.
Micole Mercurio, 77, American actress (Flashdance, What Lies Beneath, The Client).
Lou Michaels, 80, American football player (Los Angeles Rams, Pittsburgh Steelers, Baltimore Colts), pancreatic cancer.
Max Nijman, 74, Surinamese singer. 
Samuel Odulana Odungade I, 101, Nigerian royal, Olubadan of Ibadan (since 2007).
Ettore Scola, 84, Italian film director and screenwriter (We All Loved Each Other So Much, A Special Day, Le Bal), heart attack.
Sheila Sim, Lady Attenborough, 93, English actress (A Canterbury Tale, Pandora and the Flying Dutchman, West of Zanzibar), dementia.
William Y. Smith, 90, American air force general, heart failure.
Frank Sullivan, 85, American baseball player (Boston Red Sox, Philadelphia Phillies, Minnesota Twins), pneumonia.
Eugen Vollmar, 87, Swiss Olympic rower.

20
Herbert L. Abrams, 95, American physician.
Lee Abramson, 45, American composer and musician.
Arch, 21, American Thoroughbred racehorse, winner of the Super Derby (1998) and Fayette Stakes (1998), heart attack.
Bud Beardmore, 76, American lacrosse coach (Maryland), Parkinson's disease.
Constance Beresford-Howe, 93, Canadian novelist.
Subrata Bose, 83, Indian politician, cardiac arrest.
Mykolas Burokevičius, 88, Lithuanian politician, member of the Politburo of the CPSU Central Committee.
Chang Yung-fa, 88, Taiwanese businessman (Evergreen Group).
Edmonde Charles-Roux, 95, French writer.
Stuart Cowden, 90, English footballer (Stoke City).
Bairbre Dowling, 62, Irish actress (Zardoz, The Dead, War of the Buttons).
Ronald Greenwald, 82, American rabbi.
David G. Hartwell, 74, American editor, publisher and critic, injuries from a fall.
Hung-ta Chang, 102, Chinese botanist.
Brian Key, 68, British politician, MEP for Yorkshire South (1979–1984).
Kingmambo, 25, American-bred French thoroughbred racehorse, euthanized. (death announced on this date)
Valerie Pearl, 89, British historian.
Eva Schorr, 88, German painter and composer.
George Weidenfeld, Baron Weidenfeld, 96, Austrian-born British publisher, philanthropist, and newspaper columnist.
Edward Yourdon, 72, American computer scientist.

21
Ron Collins, 59, Canadian curler.
Mauro Gianneschi, 84, Italian cyclist.
Andrew J. Hinshaw, 92, American politician, member of the United States House of Representatives from California's 39th and 40th congressional districts (1973–1977).
Bill Johnson, 55, American alpine skier, Olympic champion (1984).
Bogusław Kaczyński, 73, Polish classical music journalist, stroke.
Gérard Kamanda wa Kamanda, 75, Congolese politician.
Richard Klinkhamer, 78, Dutch writer.
Derrick Todd Lee, 47, American convicted serial killer, heart disease.
Cabot Lyford, 90, American sculptor, pulmonary distress.
Harrison McIntosh, 101, American ceramicist.
Jerker Porath, 94, Swedish biochemist. 
Stephanie Rader, 100, American spy.
Garnet Richardson, 82, Canadian curler, world champion (1959, 1960, 1962, 1963).
Mrinalini Sarabhai, 97, Indian classical dancer, choreographer and instructor.
Robert Sassone, 37, French road racing cyclist, suicide.
Val Sears, 88, Canadian journalist (Toronto Star).
Francis Seow, 87, Singapore-born American writer and political refugee, pneumonia.
Michael Sheringham, 67, English literary academic. 
Ron Southern, 85, Canadian businessman (ATCO).
Robert Tuggle, 82, American writer and archivist.
Gerald Williams, 86, Welsh tennis commentator.

22
Tom Aidala, 82, American architect.
Khandaker Nurul Alam, Bangladeshi singer and composer.
Victor Arbez, 81, French Olympic skier.
Homayoun Behzadi, 73, Iranian football player (Shahin, Paykan, national team) and coach (Persepolis), Asian Champion (1968, 1972).
Eugene Borowitz, 91, American rabbi and philosopher.
Fred Bruney, 84, American football player (Boston Patriots).
Tommy Bryceland, 76, Scottish footballer (St Mirren, Norwich, Oldham).
Pete Carmichael, 74, American football coach (Jacksonville Jaguars).
Ryuichi Doi, 76, Japanese politician.
John Dowie, 60, Scottish footballer (Fulham, Celtic).
John Farris, 75, American author.
Kamer Genç, 75, Turkish politician, member of the Grand National Assembly (1987–2015), cancer.
Shankar Ghosh, 80, Indian tabla player, pneumonia.
Bill Groom, 81, Canadian curler. 
Waymond C. Huggins, 88, American politician.
Juan Manuel Ley, 82, Mexican businessman (Casa Ley).
Constantin Mihail, 70, Romanian track and field coach.
Ian Murray, 83, Scottish Roman Catholic prelate, Bishop of Argyll and the Isles (1999–2008).
Abolhassan Najafi, 86, Iranian writer and translator.
Denise Newman, 91, British Olympic diver (1948).
Mikhail Odnoralov, 71, Russian-born American painter.
Cecil Parkinson, Baron Parkinson, 84, British politician, cabinet minister, cancer.
Robert Pickus, 92, American activist.
Lois Ramsey, 93, Australian actress (The Box, Prisoner).
Miloslav Ransdorf, 62, Czech politician, MEP (since 2004).
Raymond Rock, 93, Canadian politician.
Sarah, 15, American zoo cheetah.
Anthony Simmons, 93, British screenwriter and film director (The Optimists of Nine Elms, Black Joy). 
Storm Flag Flying, 16, American thoroughbred racehorse, foaling complications.
Rik Wilson, 53, American ice hockey player (St. Louis Blues).
Tahsin Yücel, 83, Turkish writer.

23
Nikolay Abramov, 54, Russian Vepsian writer and translator.
Bob Arnott, 93, Australian Olympic alpine skier (1952).
Lela Autio, 88, American painter.
Jimmy Bain, 68, Scottish bassist (Rainbow, Dio), lung cancer.
Jack Bannister, 85, English cricket player (Warwickshire) and commentator.
Barry Brickell, 80, New Zealand ceramic artist.
*Cadalack Ron, 34, American rapper, mixed drug intoxication.
Pablo Contessi, Paraguayan doctor and politician, Governor of Presidente Hayes Department (since 2013), traffic collision.
Antony Emerson, 52, Australian tennis player, cancer.
Espectrito, 49, Mexican professional wrestler (WWF, AAA).
Josip Friščić, 66, Croatian politician, Vice President of Parliament (2008–2011).
Sofía Gandarias, 58, Spanish painter.
Archie Gouldie, 79, Canadian professional wrestler, complications from hip surgery.
Jennifer Guinness, 78, Irish socialite and kidnapping victim, cancer.
Grahame Hodgson, 79, Welsh rugby union player (national team).
Žuži Jelinek, 96, Croatian fashion stylist, designer and writer.
A. C. Jose, 78, Indian politician, Speaker of Kerala Legislature (1982), member of Parliament (1996–1997, 1998–2004).
Marie Mahoney, 91, American baseball player (AAGBPL).
R. Clayton McWhorter, 82, American businessman and philanthropist.
Elisabeta Polihroniade, 80, Romanian chess Woman Grandmaster (1982) and International Arbiter.
Bernard Quennehen, 85, French racing cyclist.
Bill Roberts, 90, American basketball player (Chicago Stags, Boston Celtics, St. Louis Bombers).
Francisco Rubio Llorente, 85, Spanish jurist, President of the Spanish Council of State (2004–2012).
George Sefcik, 76, American football coach (Cincinnati Bengals, New York Giants, Atlanta Falcons).
Koichi Sekimoto, 37, Japanese footballer (Sagan Tosu).
Dmitry Shirkov, 88, Russian theoretical physicist.
Bobby Wanzer, 94, American Hall of Fame basketball player and coach (Rochester/Cincinnati Royals), NBA Champion (1951).
Walt Williams, 72, American baseball player (Chicago White Sox, Cleveland Indians, New York Yankees), heart attack.

24
Gian Carlo Abelli, 74, Italian politician, member of the Chamber of Deputies.
Fredrik Barth, 87, Norwegian social anthropologist.
Neville Black, 90, New Zealand rugby union (Auckland, national team) and rugby league (Wigan, Keighley) player.
Yvonne Chouteau, 86, American ballerina.
David Finkelstein, 86, American physicist.
Forouzan, 78, Iranian actress.
Malcolm Grear, 84, American graphic designer.
John Jay Hooker, 85, American politician.
Christine Jackson, 53, British-born Australian cellist, complications from a brain aneurysm.
Constantijn Kortmann, 71, Dutch legal scholar.
Clyde Mashore, 70, American baseball player (Montreal Expos).
Donald Milne, 81, American politician, member of the Vermont House of Representatives (1967), cancer.
Marvin Minsky, 88, American cognitive scientist and pioneer in artificial intelligence, cerebral hemorrhage.
Wim Mook, 83, Dutch physicist.
Alejandro Muñoz-Alonso, 82, Spanish politician, member of the Congress of Deputies (1989–2000) and Senate (2000–2015).
Zarkus Poussa, 40, Finnish drummer (RinneRadio) and songwriter.
Teófilo Rodríguez, 44, Venezuelan criminal, shot.
Lois Snowe-Mello, 67, American politician, member of Maine House of Representatives (1996–2004) and Senate (2004–2012).
Schalk van der Merwe, 54, South African tennis player.
Eric Webster, 84, English football player (Manchester City) and manager (Stockport County).
Henry Worsley, 55, British adventurer, multiple organ failure.

25
Jashubhai Dhanabhai Barad, 60, Indian politician, member of Parliament (2004–2009), brain tumour.
David Chatters, 69, Canadian politician, pancreatic cancer.
Thornton Dial, 87, American artist.
Denise Duval, 94, French soprano.
Kalpana, 50, Indian actress (Thanichalla Njan), heart attack.
Howard Koslow, 91, American illustrator.
Robert Lorick, American lyricist and voice actor. (death announced on this date)
Mike Minor, 75, American actor (Petticoat Junction, All My Children, The Beverly Hillbillies), cancer.
Padmarani, 79, Indian actress.
Concepcion Picciotto, 80, Spanish-born American peace activist.
Leif Solberg, 101, Norwegian composer and organist.
Ron Stillwell, 76, American baseball player (Washington Senators), cancer.
Paul Terasaki, 86, American scientist and philanthropist.

26
Sunday Adewusi, 79, Nigerian policeman, Inspector-general of police (1981–1983).
Zaw Zaw Aung, 79, Burmese author and public intellectual. 
Black, 53, British singer-songwriter ("Wonderful Life"), head injuries sustained in a traffic collision.
Bernard Cookson, 79, British cartoonist.
Vasilya Fattakhova, 36, Russian Tatar singer, complications of childbirth.
LaVoy Finicum, 54, American cattle rancher and militant (Malheur National Wildlife Refuge Occupation), shot.
Barney Hall, 83, American sports commentator (Motor Racing Network), complications from surgery.
Gil Kahele, 73, American politician, member of the Hawaii Senate (since 2011).
Ted Karras Sr., 81, American football player (Chicago Bears), NFL champion (1963).
Tommy Kelly, 90, American actor (The Adventures of Tom Sawyer, Peck's Bad Boy with the Circus), heart failure.
Sahabzada Yaqub Khan, 95, Pakistani politician and diplomat, Minister of Foreign Affairs (1982–1991, 1996–1997), Ambassador to the United States (1973–1979).
Martin Lavut, 81, Canadian film maker (Remembering Arthur). 
Margaret Pardee, 95, American violinist and teacher.
Ray Pointer, 79, English footballer (Burnley, Coventry, Portsmouth).
 Bryce Rohde, 92, Australian jazz pianist, composer.
T.J. Tindall, 65, American guitarist (MFSB).
Jerzy Tomaszewski, 92, Polish photographer.
Takeo Uesugi, 75, Japanese landscape architect.
László Versényi, 84, Hungarian theatre and voice actor.
Abe Vigoda, 94, American actor (The Godfather, Barney Miller, Joe Versus the Volcano).
Barrington Watson, 85, Jamaican painter.
Oscar Wiggli, 88, Swiss composer and sculptor.
Larry Woods, 76, Canadian Olympic sailor.

27
Peter Baker, 84, English footballer (Tottenham Hotspur).
Barbara Berger, 85, American baseball player (AAGPBL).
John Brudenall, 77, Australian librarian.
Antonio Castellanos Mata, 68, Spanish physicist.
Mary Lou Crocker, 71, American professional golfer.
Georgy Firtich, 77, Russian composer and pianist.
Artur Fischer, 96, German inventor.
James Garrett Freeman, 35, American criminal, execution by lethal injection.
Augusto Giomo, 75, Italian Olympic basketball player (1960, 1964).
John Howe, 85, South African-born British air vice marshal.
Carlos Loyzaga, 85, Filipino Olympic basketball player (1952, 1956), bronze medalist at the 1954 FIBA World Championship.
William E. Martin, 70, American musician, songwriter, screenwriter and voice actor.
Tommy O'Hara, 63, international professional footballer.
Jack Reed, 91, American businessman and politician.
Shirley Tonkin, 94, New Zealand paediatrician and sudden infant death syndrome researcher.
DeWitt Williams, 96, American politician.
Ihor Zaytsev, 81, Russian-born Ukrainian Soviet footballer (national team).

28
Signe Toly Anderson, 74, American singer (Jefferson Airplane).   
Maheswar Baug, 85, Indian politician and independence activist.
Yisroel Belsky, 77, American rabbi.
Franklin Gene Bissell, 89, American football player and coach (Kansas Wesleyan Coyotes).
Buddy Cianci, 74, American politician and radio host, Mayor of Providence, Rhode Island (1975–1984, 1991–2002).
Robert Courtney, 56, New Zealand Paralympic champion sprinter (1984).
Aleš Debeljak, 54, Slovenian writer, struck by vehicle.
James deSouza, 90, Pakistani Roman Catholic priest.
Emile Destombes, 80, French-born Cambodian Roman Catholic prelate, Vicar Apostolic of Phnom Penh (2001–2010).
Trude Dothan, 93, Israeli archaeologist.
Paul Kantner, 74, American musician (Jefferson Airplane, Jefferson Starship) and songwriter ("Wooden Ships"), multiple organ failure.
Jim Morris, 80, American bodybuilder.
Tommy O'Hara, 62, Scottish footballer (Queen of the South, Washington Diplomats, Motherwell).
Nigel Peel, 48, English cricketer (Cheshire), brain tumour.
Peter Robinson, 57, New Zealand musician (The Tin Syndrome).
Axel Schandorff, 90, Danish track cyclist, Olympic bronze medalist (1948).
Nadine Senior, 76, English dance teacher.
Dave Thomson, 77, Scottish footballer (Dunfermline Athletic, Queen of the South).
Bob Tizard, 91, New Zealand politician, Deputy Prime Minister (1974–1975).
Ladislav Totkovič, 53, Slovak football player (Inter Bratislava) and manager.
Richard P. Von Herzen, 85, American earth scientist.

29
Karen Johnson Boyd, 91, American heiress and philanthropist.
Jean-Marie Doré, 77, Guinean politician, Prime Minister (2010). 
Billy Faier, 85, American banjo player.
Sam Hulbert, 79, American academic.
Nayani Krishnakumari, 85, Indian writer and folklorist.
Albert Low, 87, British author.
Linus Maurer, 90, American cartoonist, inspiration for the name Linus Van Pelt. 
Aurèle Nicolet, 90, Swiss flautist.
Cayetano Paderanga Jr., 67, Filipino economist, Director-General of NEDA (2010–2012), complications after heart surgery.
Ruth Rehmann, 93, German writer.
Jacques Rivette, 87, French film director (La Belle Noiseuse, Celine and Julie Go Boating, Out 1) and critic (Cahiers du cinéma), complications from Alzheimer's disease.
Philip J. Rock, 78, American politician, President of the Illinois Senate (1979–1993).
John Roper, Baron Roper, 80, British politician.
Benjamin F. Shobe, 95, American civil rights attorney and judge.
Donald I. Williamson, 94, British biologist.

30
Roberto Albanese, 65, Italian politician.
Girolamo Arnaldi, 86, Italian historian.
Tony Blaz, 57, Guamanian politician and civil servant, member of the Legislature of Guam, pneumonia.
Tias Eckhoff, 89, Norwegian industrial designer.
Asuquo Ekpe, Nigerian international footballer.
Feyrouz, 72, Egyptian actress.
Frank Finlay, 89, English actor (Othello, The Pianist, Bouquet of Barbed Wire), heart failure.
Francisco Flores Pérez, 56, Salvadoran politician, President (1999–2004), cerebral hemorrhage.
Betty Francis, 84, American baseball player (AAGBPL).
T. N. Gopakumar, 58, Indian journalist, cancer.
K. V. Krishna Rao, 92, Indian general.
Don Marks, 62, Canadian writer and indigenous rights advocate, liver disease.
Noelle Middleton, 89, Irish actress. 
Maikhail Miller, 23, American football player (Murray State, Ole Miss), traffic collision.
Kollam G. K. Pillai, 91, Indian actor.
Georgia Davis Powers, 92, American civil rights activist and politician, first female and African-American member of the Kentucky State Senate (1968–1989).
Peter Quinn, 90, Irish Gaelic footballer (Mayo).
Bill Reinhard, 93, American football player (Los Angeles Dons).
Ken Sailors, 95, American basketball player (University of Wyoming, Providence Steamrollers), complications from heart attack.
Mohammad Salimi, 78, Iranian general, Commander-in-Chief of the Army (2000–2005). 
Clarence Lorenzo Simpson Jr., 83, Liberian jurist and politician. 
Dov Yermiya, 101, Israeli army officer and author.

31
Jalal Aliyev, 87, Azerbaijani politician.
Gillian Avery, 89, British children's novelist and historian.
Mere Broughton, 79, New Zealand Māori language activist and unionist.
Miron Chichișan, 70, Romanian politician, Mayor of Zalău (1992–1996).
Lance Cox, 82, Australian football player (Richmond). 
Elizabeth Eisenstein, 92, American historian.
Tom Hancock, 67, American politician.
David Lake, 86, Indian-born Australian science fiction writer.
Artie L. Metcalf, 86, American biologist.
Bob Pelkington, 74, American basketball player (Xavier University).
Pat Piper, 81, American politician.
Betty Rosenquest Pratt, 90, American tennis player.
Wolfgang Rademann, 81, German television producer and journalist.
Donald Van Norman Roberts, 87, American civil engineer.
Randhir Singh, 94, Indian political scientist.
Benoît Violier, 44, French-Swiss chef, suicide by gunshot.
 Sir Terry Wogan, 77, Irish-British broadcaster (BBC), cancer.
Hubert Yockey, 99, American physicist and information theorist.
Yuan Geng, 98, Chinese politician and business executive.

References

2016-01
 01